A shadow cabinet is a senior group of opposition spokespeople in the Westminster system of government, also known as a shadow ministry.

Shadow Cabinet or shadow cabinet may also refer to:

 Shadow Cabinet (comics), a team of fictional superheroes
 The Shadow Cabinet, a 2006 folk metal album
 "Shadow Cabinet", s song on the album Remote Luxury by the Australian band The Church

See also